Chris Louden is an American animator. He is credited with directing several episodes of Futurama.

Directing credits

Futurama episodes
"Put Your Head on My Shoulders"
"Anthology of Interest I" (co-directed with Rich Moore)
"The Luck of the Fryrish"
"Time Keeps On Slippin'"

External links

Year of birth missing (living people)
Place of birth missing (living people)
Living people
American animators
American animated film directors
American television directors